Dmitri Shostakovich's String Quartet No. 14 in F-sharp major, Op. 142, was composed in 1972–73. It is dedicated to Sergei Shirinsky, the cellist of the Beethoven Quartet, the ensemble that premiered most of Shostakovich's quartets. The first performance was held in Leningrad on November 12, 1973.

It has three movements:

Playing time is approximately 25 minutes.

Shostakovich began working on the piece while he was visiting the home of Benjamin Britten and finished it in Copenhagen.

References

External links
 Shostakovich: the string quartets

14
1973 compositions
Compositions in F-sharp major